is a Japanese screenwriter. She has written and supervised numerous screenplays for anime series, live-action dramas and films.  Her major works include Kaleido Star, Aria, Maria-sama ga Miteru, D.Gray-man, K-On!, Bakuman and Girls und Panzer. In more recent works, she has supervised the screenplays for Majestic Prince, Non Non Biyori, A Town Where You Live, Tamako Market, Yowamushi Pedal and Castle Town Dandelion.  In films, she wrote the screenplay for The Cat Returns, the original films that would make up Digimon: The Movie, Kyoto Animation’s hit anime film A Silent Voice, and the film adaptations of Osamu Tezuka's Buddha, the second film of which was given a stamp of approval by the Dalai Lama.  She wrote the story for the manga series Tokyo Mew Mew along with illustrator Mia Ikumi. Among her works, she was recognized for Best Screenplay/Original Work for Girls und Panzer at the Tokyo Anime Award Festival in 2014, and she won another Best Screenplay/Original Work award in 2017. In 2018, she wrote the screenplay for Violet Evergarden which aired on TV in Japan and is licensed by Netflix. Her latest project is the animated series The Heike Story, produced with animation studio Science Saru.

Works

Anime

Live-action

Manga

Notes

References

 "D.Gray-man". (November 2006) Newtype USA. p. 13.
 Taniguchi, Hiroshi et al. "The Official Art of Canvas2 ~Nijiiro no Sketch~". (November 2006) Newtype USA. pp. 101–107.

External links
 
 
 Reiko Yoshida anime listing at Media Arts Database 
 Reiko Yoshida manga listing at Media Arts Database 

Anime screenwriters
Japanese screenwriters
Living people
1967 births
Writers from Hiroshima